Graham Allan Cottrell (born 23 March 1945) is a former first-class cricketer and teacher.

He attended Kingston Grammar School before going up to St Catharine's College, Cambridge. He won a Blue for hockey at Cambridge University and also played for Cambridgeshire, but was more prominent as a cricketer, playing for the University side from 1966 to 1968 and captaining the team in 1968.

Cottrell was principally a medium-pace bowler. He took 20 wickets at an average of 38.80 in 1966 and 18 at 43.72 in 1967. His best season was 1968, when he took 22 at 25.36, including his best figures of 4 for 31 in his final first-class match, against Oxford University. He was the team's most effective bowler, but gave himself only 163 overs in 12 matches.

He sometimes scored useful runs in the lower order. His highest score was 81 against Nottinghamshire in 1967 when, after Cambridge were 69 for 6, he and Chris Pyemont added 142 for the seventh wicket at better than a run a minute. Later that season he made 50 in an hour against the touring Indian team.

He played for Surrey Second XI from 1966 to 1970. In their 17-run victory over Warwickshire Second XI in 1967 he took 4 for 2 and 5 for 48. He also played a few games of Minor Counties cricket for Cambridgeshire in 1976.

He became a school teacher. He taught at Stowe School, where he was housemaster of Cobham House from 1990 to 2000.

References

External links
 Graham Cottrell at CricketArchive

1945 births
Living people
People from Datchet
People educated at Kingston Grammar School
Alumni of St Catharine's College, Cambridge
English cricketers
Cambridge University cricketers
Schoolteachers from Buckinghamshire
Cambridgeshire cricketers
Oxford and Cambridge Universities cricketers